Aleksandr Anatolyevich Yeryshov (born January 17, 1973) is a Russian water polo player who played on the silver medal squad at the 2000 Summer Olympics and the bronze medal squad at the 2004 Summer Olympics.

Yerishev became topscorer at the 2001 European Championship in Budapest, Hungary, scoring 21 goals.

See also
 Russia men's Olympic water polo team records and statistics
 List of Olympic medalists in water polo (men)
 List of men's Olympic water polo tournament top goalscorers
 List of World Aquatics Championships medalists in water polo

External links
 

1973 births
Living people
People from Tuapse
Russian male water polo players
Water polo players at the 1996 Summer Olympics
Water polo players at the 2000 Summer Olympics
Water polo players at the 2004 Summer Olympics
Olympic water polo players of Russia
Olympic silver medalists for Russia
Olympic bronze medalists for Russia
Olympic medalists in water polo
Medalists at the 2004 Summer Olympics
Medalists at the 2000 Summer Olympics
Sportspeople from Krasnodar Krai